Dóra Turóczi (born 1 December 1990 in Budapest) is a Hungarian former competitive ice dancer. With her partner Balázs Major, she is the 2014 national champion. They competed in the final segment at two World Junior Championships, finishing 12th in 2010. They also appeared at two World Championships, two European Championships, and two senior Grand Prix events.

They were coached by Ilona Berecz in Budapest, and by Muriel Zazoui and Olivier Schoenfelder in Lyon, France.

Programs 
(with Major)

Competitive highlights 
GP: Grand Prix; JGP: Junior Grand Prix

With Major

With Nagy

With Halmy

References

External links 

 

1990 births
Living people
Figure skaters from Budapest
Hungarian female ice dancers
Competitors at the 2013 Winter Universiade
Competitors at the 2011 Winter Universiade